Ticuantepe is a town and a municipality in the Managua department of Nicaragua with an estimated population of 38,520.

Etymology
Ticuantepe comes from the Nahuatl language of the first inhabitants of Nicaragua. Ticuane, which means fierce or tiger, and tepeh, which means hill, are combined to make Ticuantepe ("Hill of the Fierce").

Overview
Ticuantepe has the largest underground aquifer in the nation, and is the largest supplier of pineapples to all of Nicaragua. Ticuantepe has an estimated population of 37,545, 44.7% of which live in urban zones and 55.3% in rural zones. The town has a nice "pueblo" feel to it. It is one of the safer areas of Nicaragua and is located just 20 minutes from downtown Managua. There is easy transportation to and from Ticuantepe to most of Nicaragua by bus, microbus and moto-taxi. Located just 20 minutes from Managua and from Masaya as well as only 35 minutes from Granada, it is central but at the same time, has a rural environment. The volcano "Volcan Masaya" is about 15 minutes away.

Flora and fauna
Located in Ticuantepe is Chocoyero Nature Reserve, which is the smallest protected area in Nicaragua at just . Chocoyero is a tropical rainforest and is abundant in water. It is home to two waterfalls, El Brujo and Chocoyero, named after the Pacific parakeets that make the walls of the cliff their home, they are locally known as Chocoyos.

Chocoyero is home to an estimated 113 bird species, 29 species of mammals and 21 types of reptiles and amphibians.

Tourism
Chocoyero Nature Reserve is regarded as an important tourist attraction. Each year an estimated 10,000 people visit the reserve. There are wild howler monkeys as well as a vast array of flora and fauna and two waterfalls. It is a two-hour hike around the reserve and most people travel in and out of the reserve by moto-taxi. It is about 7 kilometers off of the main road. There are a handful of clean hotels and nice restaurants. The main hotels are Viva Guesthouse and The Chocoyo and both have pools and are secure. The restaurant Las Pitahayas is well known throughout most of Nicaragua and is located in Ticuantepe. There is one Spanish language school located in Ticuantepe; Ticuantepe Spanish School, operated by Nicaragua Spanish Schools. It is well integrated into the community and a great place to enjoy Ticuantepe.

Ticuantepe has been a sister city of Milwaukee, Wisconsin. Milwaukee residents collected aid shipments for Ticuantepe during the years of the Sandinista government, with a focus on medical supplies. After 1990, Milwaukee's aid shipments fell off as a result of the imposition of custom charges, and around 2005, the sister city relationship was discontinued.

See also
Protected areas of Nicaragua
Wildlife of Nicaragua
Managua

References

External links
Nicaragua.com Ticuantepe

Municipalities of the Managua Department